Abedin Mujezinović (born 2 June 1993) is a Bosnian middle-distance runner who competes in the 800 metres.

He won a bronze medal at the 2018 Mediterranean Games. He competed at the 2022 World Athletics Championships.

His personal best in the 800 m is 1:45.87, achieved in Lignano Sabbiadoro, Italy on 3 July 2021. He is coached by Gianni Ghidini.

References

1993 births
Living people
Bosniaks of Bosnia and Herzegovina
Bosnia and Herzegovina male middle-distance runners
Mediterranean Games medalists in athletics
Place of birth missing (living people)
Mediterranean Games bronze medalists for Bosnia and Herzegovina
Athletes (track and field) at the 2018 Mediterranean Games
Athletes (track and field) at the 2022 Mediterranean Games